Clark Field may refer to:
 Clark Air Base, a former military airfield, known as Diosdado Macapagal International Airport, but in February 2012 name reverted to Clark International Airport serving the Clark Freeport Zone, Angeles City, Philippines
 Clark Field (Fort Worth, Texas), a former home stadium of the TCU Horned Frogs football team
 Clark Field (1887), predecessor to the 1928–1974 version of Clark Field in Austin
 Clark Field (1928), a former baseball park that served the University of Texas baseball team from 1928 to 1974
 Stephenville Clark Regional Airport, an airport serving Stephenville, Texas, United States (FAA: SEP)
 Clark Field, a football stadium at Somerset High School in Somerset, Kentucky
 K. Raymond Clark Field, a multisport stadium at Coe College in Cedar Rapids, Iowa

See also
Clark Airport (disambiguation)